A music library contains music-related materials for patron use.  Collections may also include non-print materials, such as digitized music scores or audio recordings.  Use of such materials may be limited to specific patron groups, especially in private academic institutions.  Music library print collections include dictionaries and encyclopedias, indexes and directories, printed music, music serials, bibliographies, and other music literature.

Types
Traditionally, there are four types of music libraries:

Those developed to support departments of music in university or college settings;
Those developed to support conservatories and schools of music;
Those housed within public libraries;
Those developed as independent libraries or archives supporting music organizations.

Musical instrument library
A musical instrument library lends or shares musical instruments. Examples can be found in Canada; Perth, Australia; and Massachusetts, Illinois, Ohio, Washington and New Paltz, New York in the United States. Such libraries producing diapason is varying from orchestral instruments to ethno. 

With the development of the media industry (film production, production of computer games, advertising), musical works created using digital technologies have become especially in demand. Such a genre of musical composition as trailer music was born - music for film advertising (trailer, teaser). A similar genre is characterized by the use of various audio effects libraries and musical instruments. Over the past decade, a galaxy of digital musical instrument library companies has grown. Among the companies, such giants as Spitfire, Cinesamples, Heavyocity, Soundiron, Native Instruments etc. Some are focused on reproducing the sounds of the instruments of  the classical orchestra in digital format, others on creating libraries of traditional folk instruments. Famous such libraries as of Arabic instruments, Turkish, Iranian, Indian, Japanese and others. The companies are focused on the production of digital instrument libraries, which are almost as good as the living ones in sound quality. Digitalization of musical instruments is a historical process that takes place in technogenic civilizations.

Other uses
 Production music libraries license their copyrighted music for use in film, television, and radio productions.
 Performance libraries serve performing music groups, particularly large orchestras, by acquiring, preparing, and maintaining music for performance.
 Digital music libraries and archives preserve recordings and digitized scores or literature in a variety of electronic formats.  Many music libraries dedicate part of their duties to digitizing parts of their collection and maintaining digital files.  Digital preservation requires specific procedures to avoid decay, obsolescence, and loss.  Digital materials may be part of a larger, physical collection, or may compose an entirely electronic collection not physically accessible (usually housed on a network or on the Internet).  Access may be limited as a fee-based service, a private service to specific user groups (such as students at a conservatory), or freely accessible to the public.

See also
 List of online music databases
 Music librarianship
 Music Library Association, the main professional organization for the field.
 Manguinhos Library Park, Rio de Janeiro (includes a music room)
 Universal Circulating Music Library

References

Further reading
 Anderson, Gillian B. "Putting the Experience of the World at the Nation's Command: Music at the Library of Congress, 1800-1917", Journal of the American Musicological Society, vol. 42 (1989), no. 1, p. [108]-149.
 
 Bibliothèque nationale (France), Département de la Phonothèque nationale et de l'Audiovisuel = The National [Sound] Record[ings] and Audiovisual Department of the National Library [of France]. [Paris]: Bibliothèque nationale, [1986]. 9 p.
 International Association of Music Libraries. Bibliothèques d'établissement d'enseignement musical: Répertoire européen = Libraries in Music Teaching Institution[s]: European Directory. [S.l.]: International Association of Music Libraries, 1994. N.B.: Title and some of the text also in German. Without ISBN
 Langridge, Derek. Your Jazz Collection. London: C. Bingley, 1970. N.B.: Concerns both library and private jazz music collections. SBN 85157-100-X
 Lewis, Larry, ed. Union List of Music Periodicals in Canadian Libraries. Second ed. Ottawa, Ont.: Canadian Association of Music Libraries, 1981. N.B.: The title and introd. are also in French.
 McColvin, Lionel, and Harold Reeves. Music Libraries. Original ed. by Lionel Roy McColvin and Harold Reeves; completely re-written, rev., and extended by Jack Dove, in series, Grafton Book[s]. London: A. Deutsch, 1965. 2 vol. N.B.: Vol. 1 is a study of such libraries and of music librarianship; vol. 2 is a bibliog. of music literature published from 1957 to 1965.
 Music Library Association. Committee on Musical Instrument Collections. A Survey of Musical Instrument Collections in the United States and Canada, conducted by a committee of the Music Library Association, William Lichtenwanger, chairman & compiler; ed. and produced by James W. Pruitt. Ann Arbor, Mich.: Music Library Association, 1974. xi, 137 p. 
 Music Library Association. New England Chapter. Directory of Music Libraries and Collections in New England. 9th ed. Providence, R.I.: The Chapter, 1994. Lacks ISBN or ISSN.

External links

Florida State University Music Library - Contains useful links to electronic resources.
YouTube Audio Library - No Copyright Music
Improving Availability of Print Collections: A Case Study at the College-Conservatory of Music Library - by David Sandor, MLA Forum, 6, 2008.
Songwriting-guide.com/music-library - Contains more info about music libraries.
Music Library Association
https://www.loc.gov/pictures/item/gsc1994009872/PP/
Photo of proprietors of Oddmusic Instrumentarium, an instrument library in Illinois, USA, 2009

 
Library
Library